The Crooklyn Dodgers were a hip-hop supergroup based in Brooklyn, New York City, consisting of rotating members.

They appeared in three separate incarnations in 1994, 1995, and 2007. The first two incarnations recorded for the soundtracks for Spike Lee films, Crooklyn and Clockers, respectively.  The theme connecting The Crooklyn Dodgers songs, aside from the Spike Lee films for which they were made, is their topical concerns, which comment on the state of affairs in and around urban New York City, as well as other issues affecting everyday life.

Discography

Versions

Crooklyn Dodgers
The first group was composed of Buckshot, Masta Ace and Special Ed. Their first and only record was "Crooklyn", produced by Q-Tip of A Tribe Called Quest, and was featured in the 1994 film Crooklyn. The music video featured appearances by Brooklyn-born athletes Michael Jordan and Mike Tyson.

Crooklyn Dodgers '95
The second group was composed of Chubb Rock, Jeru the Damaja and O.C. Their first and only record was "Return of the Crooklyn Dodgers", produced by DJ Premier, and was featured in the 1995 film Clockers.

Crooklyn Dodgers III
The third group consisted of Jean Grae, Mos Def and Memphis Bleek. North Carolina producer 9th Wonder resurrected the group concept in 2007 for a track on his album The Dream Merchant Vol. 2, titled "Brooklyn in My Mind".

References

External links
Discogs: Crooklyn Dodgers (information on first group)
Discogs: Crooklyn Dodgers '95 (information on second group)

Hip hop supergroups
Hip hop collectives
Hip hop groups from New York City
Musical groups established in 1994
1994 establishments in New York City